Soranjeh (also Romanized as Sarenjeh, Serenjeh, and Sorenjeh; also known as Serenjeh-ye Do Āb and Serenjeh-ye Doāb) is a village in Doab Rural District, in the Central District of Selseleh County, Lorestan Province, Iran. At the 2006 census, its population was 64, in 12 families.

References 

Towns and villages in Selseleh County